Daughter of Darkness is a 1948 British film, with macabre overtones, directed by Lance Comfort and starring Anne Crawford, Maxwell Reed and – in the central role – Siobhán McKenna. Released in January 1948, it was based on a then ten-year-old play by Max Catto called They Walk Alone. An expensive film for its day, it was shot at Riverside Studios, Hammersmith, London, (known at that time as Alliance Studios) and on location. McKenna was offered a Hollywood contract following her memorable performance, but heeded the counsel of Laurence Olivier to remain in theatre work.

Plot
In the small Irish town of Ballyconnen, Emmy Baudine (Siobhán McKenna) is a beautiful but disturbed young woman who works for the local priest. When the fair comes to town, she encounters Dan (Maxwell Reed), a handsome young boxer – and lays his face open with her fingernails when he attempts to seduce her. Urged by the village women's jealousy and forebodings, Father Corcoran (Liam Redmond), reluctantly sends Emmy to friends, farming family, in Yorkshire, and Emmy endeavours to suppress the strange feelings of fascination and revulsion that she experiences in the presence of the opposite sex. But the fair's seeping, relentless prowl for profit, has already left Ireland, and is trundling its poisoned way through the arteries of Britain, seemingly knowing where its next victims live. Their next meeting cannot be resisted; nor can the allure of Emmy Baudine: to wherever she moves.

Cast

 Anne Crawford as Bess Stanforth
 Maxwell Reed as Dan
 Siobhán McKenna as Emmy Baudine
 George Thorpe as Tallent
 Barry Morse as Robert Stanforth
 Liam Redmond as Father Cocoran
 Cyril Smith as Joe
 Honor Blackman as Julie Tallent
 Denis Gordon as Saul Trevethick
 Grant Tyler as Larry Tallent
 Norman Shelley as Smithers
 George Merritt as Constable
 Iris Vandeleur as Mrs. Smithers 
 Ann Clery as Miss Foley
 Arthur Hambling as Jacob
 David Greene as David Price

Critical reception
The Radio Times wrote, "an opportunity to see McKenna, one of the most compelling of Irish stage actresses, portraying a maniac with full-blooded commitment."

TV Guide noted, "strong stuff for 1948."

In his Guide to British Cinema, Geoff Mayer writes, "Daughter of Darkness, with a budget of two hundred thousand pounds and three weeks of location shooting in Cornwall, was not a financial success and represented a setback to Comfort's career, which saw him relegated to low-budget films in the 1950s and 1960s. Yet the film's mixture of gothic and horror establishes it as one of the most startling British films of the 1940s. "

References

External links

1948 films
1948 crime films
British crime films
Films directed by Lance Comfort
Films scored by Clifton Parker
British black-and-white films
1940s English-language films
1940s British films